Imam-ul-Haq parchi (born 22 December 1995) is a Pakistani international cricketer. On his One Day International (ODI) debut against Sri Lanka, he became the second batsman for Pakistan, and thirteenth overall, to score a century on debut. In August 2018, he was one of thirty-three players to be awarded a central contract for the 2018–19 season by the Pakistan Cricket Board (PCB).

Domestic career
In the final of the 2016–17 Quaid-e-Azam Trophy, he scored 200 not out batting for Habib Bank Limited. In the final of 2017–18 National T20 Cup, he scored 59 not out batting for Lahore Blues, and was named man of the match.

In July 2022, he was signed by Somerset to play in their final four matches of the County Championship in England.

International career
In October 2017, he was named in Pakistan's One Day International (ODI) squad for their series against Sri Lanka. He made his ODI debut for Pakistan against Sri Lanka on 18 October 2017, scored a maiden ODI century and was named man of the match. He became the second Pakistan batsman after Saleem Elahi to score an ODI hundred on debut.

In April 2018, he was named in Pakistan's Test squad for their tours to Ireland and England in May 2018. He made his Test debut for Pakistan, against Ireland, on 11 May 2018. He scored a half century in the final innings of the match which was instrumental in the team's win.

On 20 July 2018, in the fourth ODI against Zimbabwe, he and Fakhar Zaman made the highest opening partnership in ODIs, with 304 runs. Pakistan finished their innings at 399 for the loss of one wicket, their highest score in ODIs. Zaman and Imam had scored 705 runs together across the series, the most by a pair in a bilateral ODI series.

In January 2019, during the third ODI against South Africa, Imam became the second fastest batsman to score 1,000 runs in ODIs, doing so in his 19th innings.

In April 2019, he was named in Pakistan's squad for the 2019 Cricket World Cup. He made his Twenty20 International (T20I) debut for Pakistan against England on 5 May 2019. Ahead of the Cricket World Cup, in the ODI series against England, Imam scored 151 runs in the third ODI match. This was the highest individual total for a Pakistan batsman against England in a One Day International.

In June 2020, he was named in a 29-man squad for Pakistan's tour to England during the COVID-19 pandemic. In July, he was shortlisted in Pakistan's 20-man squad for the Test matches against England. In July 2021, in the third match against England, he scored his 2,000th run in ODI cricket.

In March 2022, in the opening match of the series against Australia, Imam scored his first century in Test cricket. In the second innings, he scored another century, becoming the tenth batter for Pakistan to score a century in both innings of a Test.

Personal life
He was born in Multan on 22 December 1995. He is the nephew of Inzamam-ul-Haq, a former Pakistani cricket star who also served as the national team's captain. Their ancestors migrated to Pakistan from the city of Hansi in the present-day Indian state of Haryana, in 1947.

References

External links
 

1995 births
Living people
Pakistani cricketers
Pakistan Test cricketers
Pakistan One Day International cricketers
Pakistan Twenty20 International cricketers
Baluchistan cricketers
Habib Bank Limited cricketers
Islamabad cricketers
Lahore Blues cricketers
Cricketers from Multan
Peshawar Zalmi cricketers
Somerset cricketers
Cricketers who made a century on One Day International debut
Cricketers at the 2019 Cricket World Cup
Pakistani people of Haryanvi descent
People from Lahore